Nineteenth Army or 19th Army may refer to:

Germany
 19th Army (German Empire), a World War I field Army
 19th Army (Wehrmacht), a World War II field army

Others
 Nineteenth Army (Japan)
 19th Army (Soviet Union)